Sri Lakshmi Varaha Swamy Temple is a 500-year-old Indian temple dedicated to Varaha, the boar incarnation of Vishnu.

Location
The temple is located in the Indian state of Odisha, in the Kendrapara District. Brahmani River is the nearest river. The temple is about one kilometer away from the center of tehsil Aul, which is situated about 146 km from the state capital of Bhubaneswar. It is 17 km from Pattamundai and 38 km from Kendrapara. Regular bus services are available from Kendrapara, Cuttack, Bhadrak and Bhubaneswar. The nearest railway station is Bhadrak, on the Chennai–Howrah railway route.

Legend of Varahajew
The king of Aul was a devotee of Lakshmi-Varaha. The deity was in the Biraja Temple in the Jajpur District, along with Yajna Baraha Temple and the king often went there to offer Puja, which is a Hindu act of worship. One day during the month of Shraavana, the Baitarani River flooded, so the darśana was cancelled. Believing that the deity couldn't tolerate that, the king dreamed that the deity came with him to his place to Aul (locally called Alli). One day the deity came, following the king's path of return, after puja. As the king was returning by horseback, he listened to the sound of the deity following him. At Aul the sound of the deity's walking stopped. In this place, the devoted king built the deity's holy temple. The Yajna Baraha Temple remains there in Jajpur. The present temple was renovated by the late king of Aul, Sri Brajasundar Dev during the 20th century, after the temple had been in a ruined state for the previous 500 years.

Festivals
Baraha Dwadashi, Avatara divas of baraha on Maagha shukla dwadashi gathers a lakh of devotees from around the area.
Baraha Dola Yatra, the swing festival during Phalguna or Holi.
Raja Parva
Vijaya Dashami
Kumar Purnima
Kartik Purnima
Ratha Yatra
Bakula Amawasya
Samba Dasami
Makara Sankranti
Pana Sankranti
Subha Sunia

See also
Bhitarkanika National Park
 Akhandalamani Temple
 Srimushnam
 Aali
 Pattamundai
 Kendrapara

References

External links 
Map location
Nirakar Mahalik (2005). Balabhadra Upasana and Tulasi Kshetra. The Orissa Review
Baraza jew temple, Aul photogallery
History of Aul Rajvamsha

Varaha temples
Hindu temples in Odisha
Kendrapara district